(Åh) När ni tar saken i egna händer is a song by After Dark that charted at Svensktoppen, entering on 18 March 2007, but remained on the chart for only one week.

Single track listing
Åh, när ni tar saken i egna händer (Radio Version)
Åh, när ni tar saken i egna händer (SoundFactory Masterclub Mix)
Åh, när ni tar saken i egna händer (SoundFactory Radio Edit)
Åh, när ni tar saken i egna händer (Karaoke Version)

Charts

Weekly charts

Year-end charts

References

External links
 Information at Svensk mediedatabas

2007 singles
After Dark (drag act) songs
Melodifestivalen songs of 2007
Swedish-language songs
Songs written by Henrik Wikström
2007 songs